Mission Creek is a large creek in the Okanagan Region of British Columbia. Originally called  N'wha-kwi-sen (smoothing stones), it was later mapped as Rivière de l’Anse-au-Sable (Sandy Bay River), the name Mission Creek was adopted in 1860 in honour of the Catholic Oblate Mission established by Father Pandosy and other settlers.
The Creek rises in the Greystoke Mountain Range and runs west about  before emptying into Okanagan Lake south of Kelowna. 
Mission Creek was designated a BC Heritage River by the province in 1996.

Kokanee
Mission Creek is the main spawning channel of Kokanee. 
The landlocked salmon likely made their way into the Okanagan when a remnant of Glacial Lake Penticton was connected by streams to the Pacific Ocean.

Mission Creek Greenway

The Mission Creek Greenway is a linear park extending along the creek from the shores of Okanagan Lake to Mission Creek Falls.
Geological features along the trail are numerous and diverse, including; Layer Cake Hill, the Pinnacle, the White Lake Formation, 
hoodoos, exposures of ancient river systems and gigantic boulders dropped by the Fraser Glacier.

Channelization
Mission Creek has been heavily modified through narrowing of the channel by the building of dikes for flood control from East Kelowna Bridge to the river mouth at
Okanagan Lake. The Mission Creek channel has lost natural alluvial geomorphic processes (riffles, stream pools, and meanders), 
connection to the floodplain and wetlands, fish spawning and incubation habitats, diverse fish rearing habitats, diverse overwintering habitats, and fish refuge from high velocity water.

Mining
The creek was first mined in the 1870s. Later people such as Dan Gallagher mined the creek until the 1940s. British Columbia historian Bill Barlee believes the lost McLean Mine is located between the headwaters of Mission Creek and Monashee Creek. McLean was a First Nations prospector who lived near Kelowna.
Placer mining occurred in Mission Creek around the early 20th century.

Bridges
Several bridges span the Mission Creek. Here is a list starting from Lake Okanagan:
 Lakeshore Road - this bridge was rebuilt in the summer of 2014.
 Gordon Drive - this bridge was rebuilt in the summer of 2010
 Casorso Road - this bridge was rebuilt in the summer of 2007
 KLO Road
 East Kelowna Road 
 Bridges above Gallagher's Canyon are not listed (Forestry Roads and Highways)

References

External links
 Friends of Mission Creek Society
 Mission Creek Restoration Initiative

Rivers of the Okanagan
Articles containing video clips